Kotek may refer to:

People 

 Elliot V. Kotek, Australian producer and filmmaker
 Iosif Kotek (1855–1885), Russian violinist and composer
 Sibylle Bolla-Kotek (1913–1969), Austrian legal scholar
 Tina Kotek (born 1966), American politician
 Vojtěch Kotek (born 1988), Czech actor

Places 

 Kotek, Kurdistan, a village in Iran